Shahrak-e Ayatollah Motahhari (also Romanized as Shahrak-e Āyatollāh Moţahharī; also known as Kovīkh, Qal‘eh-ye Rob Kovīkh, and Shahrak-e Moţahharī) is a village in Qeblehi Rural District, in the Central District of Dezful County, Khuzestan Province, Iran. At the 2006 census, its population was 762, in 166 families.

References 

Populated places in Dezful County